William Pratt Marontate (December 3, 1919 – January 15, 1943) was a decorated United States Marine Corps flying ace who was awarded the Navy Cross during World War II. He was credited with 13 aerial victories before he was killed in action.

Early life and service 
William P. Marontate was born on December 3, 1919, in Seattle, Washington. Marontate joined the Marine Corps in June 1941. Designated as a Naval aviator, Marontate was assigned to Marine Fighting Squadron 121 (VMF-121) at Camp Kearney, California.

While at Camp Kearney in August 1942, Marontate took one of the few operational planes the squadron had and crashed it into a gun emplacement. He was subsequently reprimanded by the squadron's new executive officer, Captain Joe Foss. It was Foss's first day as the XO. Marontate would later become good friends with Foss.

Cactus Air Force ace 
Marine pilots with VMF-121 arrived at Henderson Field in Guadalcanal in October 1942. First Lieutenant Marontate arrived at the airfield on October 9. Marontate saw his first combat action the next day, when he helped escort friendly dive bombers which attacked Japanese ships. Marontate quickly distinguished himself as one of the top fighter aces of the squadron, racking up nine aerial victories during his first tour with the Cactus Air Force. In mid-November, VMF-121 was relieved and went to Sydney, Australia for rest.

VMF-121 returned to Guadalcanal for their second tour in late December. On January 5, 1943, First Lieutenant Marontate led his section to break up a Japanese dive bomber attack on American ships. Marontate downed two dive bombers and one A6M Zero, bringing his number of victories to twelve.

Death 
On January 15, First Lieutenant Marontate and other members of VMF-121 were escorting dive bombers near Vella Lavella in the New Georgia Islands. Marontate shot down at least one Japanese Zero, his 13th and final kill of the war, before he himself was shot down. Joe Foss observed Marontate's F4F Wildcat falling out of the sky with a missing wing. Foss later learned that Marontate was involved in a mid-air collision with a Zero and had bailed out of his plane. Marontate was listed as missing in action, and was declared dead in February 1945.

William P. Marontate's body was never recovered. For his superb airmanship during the Guadalcanal campaign, Marontate was posthumously awarded the Navy Cross and promoted to captain. Marontate's name is inscribed on a memorial in the Manila American Cemetery in the Philippines.

References 

1919 births
1943 deaths
United States Marine Corps personnel killed in World War II
American World War II flying aces
Aviators from Washington (state)
Aviators killed by being shot down
Recipients of the Navy Cross (United States)
Recipients of the Air Medal
United States Marine Corps officers
United States Marine Corps pilots of World War II
United States Naval Aviators
Aviators killed in aviation accidents or incidents
Missing in action of World War II